Vladimir Ivanovich Gorokhov (May 26, 1911 – November 1, 1985) was a Soviet football player and coach.

Gorokhov was the head coach of Spartak Moscow in 1940, in 1942-1943, and a coach in 1945.

References

1911 births
1985 deaths
Burials at Vagankovo Cemetery
FC Spartak Moscow players
FC Spartak Moscow managers
FC Kuban Krasnodar managers
FC Chornomorets Odesa managers
Soviet football managers
Soviet footballers
Association football defenders